Bučje is a village in Požega-Slavonia County, Croatia. The village is administered as a part of the City of Pleternica.
According to national census of 2011, population of the village is 318. The village is connected by the D38 state road.

Notable people
Leon Geršković - lawyer, legal scholar and politician

Sources

Populated places in Požega-Slavonia County